"Are You Man Enough?" is the name of a 1987 hit single by the British pop group Five Star. The single was released only in the US, where it peaked at #15 on Billboard's Hot R&B Singles chart in April of that year, becoming their sixth and final US Top 20 entry.

The single was taken from their second album, Silk & Steel.

Formats and track listings
7" single:  5149-7-R
 "Are You Man Enough?" (7" Remix Version) 4:15
 "Summer Groove" 5:22

12" single: 6309-1-RD
 "Are You Man Enough?" (12" Vocal Remix) 6:38 
 "Are You Man Enough?" (12" Dub Remix) 5:15
 "Are You Man Enough?" (Acapella Groove) 1:23
 "Summer Groove" 5:22

All tracks available on the remastered versions of either the 2010 'Silk & Steel' album, the 2013 'The Remix Anthology (The Remixes 1984–1991)' or the 2018 'Luxury – The Definitive Anthology 1984-1991' boxset.

Charts

References

Five Star songs
1987 singles
Songs written by Paul Gurvitz
Songs written by Nick Trevisick
Song recordings produced by Richard James Burgess